Zouhair El-Ouardi (born 15 February 1977) is a Moroccan middle-distance runner. He competed in the men's 3000 metres steeplechase at the 2004 Summer Olympics.

References

1977 births
Living people
Athletes (track and field) at the 2004 Summer Olympics
Moroccan male middle-distance runners
Moroccan male steeplechase runners
Olympic athletes of Morocco
Place of birth missing (living people)